is a Japanese manga series by Akira Oze. It won the award for best shōnen manga at the 31st Shogakukan Manga Award. It was adapted into a TV special in 1986.

Cast
Ryōko Sano
Kazumi Kawai
Naoto Nagashima

References

External links

1981 manga
Shogakukan manga
Shōnen manga
Winners of the Shogakukan Manga Award for shōnen manga